Logi Eldon Geirsson (born 10 October 1982), born in Reykjavík is a retired Icelandic handballer. His retirement was due to successive shoulder injuries.

Raised in Hafnarfjörður, Iceland. He's the son of former Icelandic star Geir Hallsteinsson, who also played as a professional handballer during his playing career.

He started his playing career with multiple Icelandic champions, FH Hafnarfjörður. After playing with the FH first team for a couple of years, Logi was sold to TBV Lemgo and finally got into the Icelandic national team. However, he did not get many chances for the Icelandic national team until Viggó Sigurðsson took over from Guðmundur Guðmundsson after the 2004 Olympic Games.

External links
 profile
  official website

1982 births
Handball players at the 2008 Summer Olympics
Logi Geirsson
Living people
Medalists at the 2008 Summer Olympics
Logi Geirsson
Olympic medalists in handball
Logi Geirsson
Logi Geirsson
Recipients of the Order of the Falcon
Logi Geirsson